Birna Norðdahl (1920 – 8 February 2004) was an Icelandic chess player, two-times winner the Icelandic Women's Chess Championship (1976, 1980).

Biography
From the end of 1960s to the begin 1980s, Birna Norðdahl was one of Iceland's leading female chess players. She two times won Icelandic Women's Chess Championships: 1976 and 1980.

Birna Norðdahl played for Iceland in the Women's Chess Olympiads:
 In 1978, at third board in the 8th Chess Olympiad (women) in Buenos Aires (+2, =0, -6),
 In 1980, at first reserve board in the 9th Chess Olympiad (women) in Valletta (+1, =4, -1).

Birna Norðdahl played for Iceland in the Nordic Chess Cup:
 In 1975, at fifth board in the 6th Nordic Chess Cup in Hindås (+2, =0, -3).

References

1920 births
2004 deaths
Icelandic female chess players
Chess Olympiad competitors